Valli Asari Mookan (born 1931) is an Indian weightlifter. He competed in the men's bantamweight event at the 1956 Summer Olympics.

References

1931 births
Living people
Indian male weightlifters
Olympic weightlifters of India
Weightlifters at the 1956 Summer Olympics
Place of birth missing (living people)